(born Percy Pomaikai Kipapa, July 16, 1973 – May 16, 2005)  was a sumo wrestler from Hawaii, United States. His sumo stable was Azumazeki. His height was 192 cm (6 ft 3 and a half in) and his peak weight was 224 kg (494 lbs). His highest rank was jūryō 10.

Career
Born in Kailua, Oahu, he joined Azumazeki stable in November 1991, a few months after high school graduation. His first shikona was Wakataisei, with a change to Daiki in 1993. His career record was 153 wins against 119 losses, with 19 bouts missed due to injury over 38 tournaments. His peak weight of 224 kilograms (494 lbs) means he ranks equal seventeenth in the list of heaviest sumo wrestlers. He was a former tsukebito or personal attendant to fellow Hawaiian Akebono Tarō, whom he credited for helping him reach the sekitori ranks. He was ranked in the jūryō division for four tournaments from September 1995 to March 1996.  He retired from sumo in 1998, due to appendicitis and  knee injuries. He was fluent in Japanese and after returning to his home in Waikane, Oahu according to his mother he worked for a tour company and in lomilomi massage. At the time of his death he had become addicted to methamphetamines.

Death
He was found dead from multiple stab wounds in a truck in Kahaluu, Hawaii. He had been killed by his Castle High School friend, Kealiiokalani Meheula, in a dispute over money. Meheula claimed self-defense but was found guilty of second-degree murder and sentenced to life imprisonment on September 7, 2006.

His death was the subject of a book by Mark Panek, published in 2011 as Big Happiness: The Life and Death of a Modern Hawaiian Warrior; "Big Happiness" was the translation of Kipapa's sumo shikona of Daiki.

Career record

Further reading 

 Big Happiness: the life and death of a modern Hawaiian warrior by Mark Panek (2011)

See also
List of past sumo wrestlers

References

1973 births
2005 deaths
American sumo wrestlers
Sumo people from Hawaii